In the Church of Jesus Christ of Latter-day Saints (LDS Church), the Quorum of the Twelve Apostles (also known as the Quorum of the Twelve, the Council of the Twelve Apostles, or simply the Twelve) is one of the governing bodies in the church hierarchy. Members of the Quorum of the Twelve Apostles are apostles, with the calling to be prophets, seers, and revelators, evangelical ambassadors, and special witnesses of Jesus Christ.

The quorum was first organized in 1835 and designated as a body of "traveling councilors" with jurisdiction outside areas where the church was formally organized, equal in authority to the First Presidency, the Seventy, the standing Presiding High Council, and the high councils of the various stakes. The jurisdiction of the Twelve was originally limited to areas of the world outside Zion or its stakes. After the apostles returned from their missions to England, Joseph Smith altered the responsibilities of the quorum: it was given charge of the affairs of the church, under direction of the First Presidency.

Role of the quorum

The Quorum of the Twelve Apostles claims a leadership role second only to that of the First Presidency. At the time of the death of Joseph Smith, the President of the Quorum of the Twelve Apostles was Brigham Young. Young emphasized what he said was Smith's authorization that the Quorum of the Twelve should be the central governing body of the church after Smith's death. Then, in 1847, the Twelve reorganized the First Presidency with Young as President, and the Twelve took on a supporting role within a chain of command under the First Presidency, a role that continues to the present.  

The Quorum of the Twelve Apostles in the LDS Church has some general similarities to the College of Cardinals of the Catholic Church, primarily in its duty to choose a successor upon the death of a church president. There are differences, due in part to the President and the Twelve having life tenure, which may lead to an older or infirm President of the Church, but also provides considerable training of apostles to take over the office of the Presidency: 
Church policy decisions are made unanimously, with consultation among the First Presidency, the Quorum of the Twelve, and where appropriate, the Seventy, each of which has its own responsibility. Effort is made to ensure that the organizations are united in purpose and policy.

Each member of the quorum is accepted by the church as an apostle, as well as a "prophet, seer, and revelator." Thus, each apostle is considered to hold the "keys of the priesthood", "the rights of presidency, or the power given to man by God to direct, control, and govern God’s priesthood on earth." Individually and collectively, the Twelve Apostles hold the keys and have conferred the authority to exercise all of the keys upon the President of the Church. Thus, as outlined in the Doctrine and Covenants, only the President of the Church is entitled to receive revelation or dictate policy for the church.

A major role of the Twelve is to appoint a successor when the President of the Church dies. Shortly after this occurs, the apostles meet in a room of the Salt Lake Temple to appoint a successor. Invariably the successor has been the most senior member of the Twelve, with seniority determined by the longest continuous duration of service. The apostles lay their hands on his head and ordain him and set him apart as President of the Church. The president then chooses two counselors in the First Presidency, who are high priests (usually apostles). The second most senior surviving apostle becomes the President of the Quorum of the Twelve. In cases when the President of the Quorum is simultaneously called to be a counselor in the First Presidency, or is unable to serve due to health considerations, an Acting President of the Quorum of the Twelve Apostles is called to fill the position. This has invariably been the most senior member of the quorum who is not a member of the First Presidency.

As vacancies arise within the quorum, the Twelve and counselors in the First Presidency are invited to meet and counsel together in prayer in order to recommend to the President of the Church whom will be called to fill the vacancy. The final decision rests with the President of the Church, but is formally voted on by the Twelve and the counselors in the First Presidency. The chosen man is generally ordained an apostle by the President of the Church, a counselor in the First Presidency, or the President of the Twelve. Depending on circumstances, this may occur before or after a sustaining vote is held at a church general conference. Any Melchizedek priesthood holder is eligible to be called as an apostle. Generally, new apostles have considerable experience in church government and have served faithfully as bishops, stake presidents, mission presidents, or seventies.

As a matter of policy, apostles are generally asked to retire from their professional careers and devote themselves to full-time church service, including memberships of boards and professional organizations. Some apostles receive assignments to become members of boards of church-owned for-profit corporations and trustees of the church's educational institutions. (Some exceptions have been made to this rule, as when quorum member Ezra Taft Benson was permitted to serve as United States Secretary of Agriculture from 1953 to 1961 and when quorum member Reed Smoot was permitted to serve in the United States Senate from 1903 to 1933.) The calling of an apostle is typically a lifetime calling.

Current members
The current members of the quorum are as follows:

See also

 List of members of the Quorum of the Twelve Apostles (LDS Church)
 List of general authorities of The Church of Jesus Christ of Latter-day Saints
 Presiding Bishop (LDS Church)
 Regional Representative of the Twelve
 Twelve Apostles
 Chronology of the Quorum of the Twelve Apostles (LDS Church)

Notes

References

 

.

Further reading

 — Hinckley self-describes the process of becoming President of the LDS Church
 — article on new apostles being added in 2004
 — article on procedures for filling vacancies, 2004

External links
Prophets and Apostles Speak Today at LDS.org (Official)
Official Biographies for leaders of The Church of Jesus Christ of Latter-day Saints, Newsroom, LDS Church — includes biographical sketches of current members of the Quorum

 
Leadership positions in the Church of Jesus Christ of Latter-day Saints
Organizational subdivisions of the Church of Jesus Christ of Latter-day Saints
 Quorum of the Twelve Apostles

Religious organizations established in 1835
1835 establishments in the United States
Latter Day Saint hierarchy